The Filthy Six are a British jazz group encompassing funk, acid jazz, and soul jazz, involving the use of Hammond organ.

Background
The group has been described as a "soulful Hammond groove" sextet. The group has been compared to the James Taylor Quartet at times.

Career
In March 2016, the group released the album More Filth and went on tour to promote the album.

On 17 November 2016, the group was headlining at the  Downtown GetDown on the Adams Street Commons in Tallahassee.

Personnel
 Nick Etwell
 Mark Brown
 Nigel Price
 Pete Whittaker
 Dan Drury
 Simon Lea

Discography

References

Acid jazz ensembles
British jazz ensembles
Acid Jazz Records artists